Tall Zard is a village in Hana Rural District, Abadeh Tashk District, Neyriz County, Fars Province, Iran. At the 2006 census, its population was 289, in 66 families.

References 

Populated places in Abadeh Tashk County